George Black (1854 – 5 May 1913) was a Scottish physician who operated a vegetarian hotel in Belstone called Dartmoor House. 

Black was born in Edinburgh where he obtained his M.B. He was Medical Officer of Health to the Keswick Urban Council. He worked as a medical doctor at Greta Bank on Greenway Road in Chelston, Torquay. He became a vegetarian in 1896 for humanitarian reasons and was Vice-President of the Devon branch of the Vegetarian Society. In 1899, he purchased Dartmoor House in Belstone and converted it into a vegetarian hotel for his patients. The Vegetarian Society's annual picnic was held at the grounds of the house. The vegetarian cook at the hotel was Isabel Densham. In 1908, Black authored A Manual of Vegetarian Cookery featuring Densham's recipes.

Black was an advocate of whole foods and suggested that white flour is detrimental to health because the bran and wheat germ are removed. He was a friend of James Henry Cook and was a scientific researcher for the Pitman Health Food Company. Through his guidance Nuto Cream Soup and Nut Cream were invented which contained no cows milk and only needed the addition of water so were easily digested. The Pitman Health Food Company also sold Vegsal, a medicinal salt obtained from vegetables through Black's research.

Black was an anti-vivisectionist. He was a member of the British Homoeopathic Society and contributed articles to homeopathic journals. He was a supporter of the Order of the Golden Age.

Black authored popular medical books which went through many editions. He was the editor of Household Medicine which is notable for prescribing the correct amount of hours one should sleep, depending on age and physical health. In 1899, he authored Viscum Album: The Common Mistletoe which documented its natural history and scientific uses in the treatment of disease. 

He died in Torquay on 5 May 1913.

Selected publications

Household Medicine (1881)
First Aid (1887)
Sick-Nursing (1888)
Some Physical Aspects of the Temperance Question (1890)
Every-Day Ailments and Accidents, and Their Treatment at Home (1892)
Viscum Album: The Common Mistletoe (1899)
A Manual of Vegetarian Cookery (1908)
The Doctor at Home and Nurse's Guide-Book (1909)
The Doctor and Nurse's Guide (1910)
The Olive: Its Medicinal and Curative Virtues (1910)

The Long Life Series 

Long Life and How to Reach It (1888)
Sleep and How to Obtain It (1888)
The Mouth and the Teeth (1888)
The Skin in Health and Disease (1888)
The Throat and the Voice (1888)
The Young Wife’s Advice Book (1888)

References

1854 births
1913 deaths
19th-century Scottish medical doctors
20th-century Scottish medical doctors
Anti-vivisectionists
British homeopaths
People associated with the Order of the Golden Age
People associated with the Vegetarian Society
Scottish medical writers
Scottish temperance activists
Scottish vegetarianism activists
Vegetarian cookbook writers
Writers from Edinburgh
Writers from Torquay